The Menara Kudus Mosque or Al-Aqsha Mosque is located in Kudus in the Indonesian province of Central Java. Dating from 1549, it is one of the oldest mosques in Indonesia, built at the time of Islam's spread through Java. The mosque preserves the tomb of Sunan Kudus, one of the nine Islamic saints of Java (the Wali Sanga), and it is a popular pilgrimage point.

Architecture

It preserves pre-Islamic architectural forms such as old Javanese split doorways, ancient Hindu-Buddhist influenced Majapahit-style red brickwork, and a three-tired pyramidal roof. The most unusual feature is the brick minaret on which a pavilion shelters a large skin drum (bedug) which is used to summon the faithful to prayer instead of the more common muezzin. Whereas a bedug normally hangs under the eaves of a mosque veranda, in the Kudus Mosque it sits in a tower like a Balinese Hindu temple kul-kul or signal drum used to warn of impending attack, fire, or communal event. No other mosque in Java is known to have a drum tower of this type.

In front of the minaret and around the compound are walls and gateways in the old candi bentar (split gate) and kori agung (main gate) styles. Inside are two gateways—a smaller, inner gate with relief panels on either side similar to those found in Mantingan, and an outer gate that is reminiscent of the 14th-century Bajang Ratu gate at Trowulan. Other pre-Islamic touches include 8 kala-head water spouts in the ablution area and Ming porcelain plates set in the walls.

The pre-Islamic elements suggest the complex has incorporated a pre-existing Hindu-Javanese structure. The mosque has been rebuilt several times removing evidence of what the original structure looked like. The Majapahit style gates, walls, and minaret that appear so incongruous today may have blended more harmoniously with the main structure (which probably had a meru roof supported by large pillars, as in Cirebon and Demak). The peaked roof is a 1920s renovation with terracotta tiles replacing wooden tiles, with glass windows inserted between the roof tiers. The roof is topped with a mastaka crown roof element. An inscription over the mihrab says the mosque was founded by Ja'far Shodiq in AH 956 (AD 1549). He is believed to be the venerated Sunan Kudus one of the nine Islamic saints of Java (Wali Sanga) who lies buried in an elaborately carved mausoleum behind the mosque. The complex includes a Mogul-style mosque with a silvery onion-dome and concrete pillars.

See also
Indonesian architecture
Mosques in Indonesia

External links
 25 images at archnet.org

References

Mosques in Indonesia
Religious buildings and structures converted into mosques
History of Islam in Indonesia
Religious buildings and structures in Central Java
Cultural Properties of Indonesia in Central Java
Religious buildings and structures completed in 1549